Anna A. Eshoo (née Georges; born December 13, 1942) is an American politician serving as the U.S. representative from . She is a member of the Democratic Party. The district, numbered as the 18th district from 2013 to 2023, is based in Silicon Valley, including the cities of Redwood City, Sunnyvale, Mountain View, and Palo Alto, as well as part of San Jose. Eshoo is the only Assyrian American in Congress and the only Armenian American woman in Congress.

Early life and education 
Anna Eshoo was born in New Britain, Connecticut, of Assyrian and Armenian heritage.  Her mother fled from Armenia to Iraq, and subsequently to the United States. Her father, Fred Georges, a jeweler and watchmaker, was a Chaldean Christian. Eshoo graduated from New Britain High School in 1960, and later moved to California.  She received an associate of arts degree from Cañada College in 1975.

Early political career
Eshoo was Chair of the San Mateo Democratic Party from 1978 to 1982. She was also a member of the Democratic National Committee in the 1980s. She was chief of staff to Speaker pro tempore Leo McCarthy of the California State Assembly in 1981–82. Eshoo was elected to the San Mateo County Board of Supervisors in 1982 and served until 1992. She was president of the board in 1986.

U.S. House of Representatives

Elections

1988
In the middle of Eshoo's second term on the San Mateo Board of Supervisors, she ran for Congress in California's 12th congressional district. She won the Democratic primary with a plurality of 43%, but lost the general election to Republican Stanford law professor Tom Campbell, 51–46%.

1992
Campbell gave up his congressional seat to make an unsuccessful bid for the United States Senate, and Eshoo entered the Democratic primary for the open seat, which had been renumbered as the 14th district. She won the seven-way primary with a plurality of 40%. In the general election, she defeated Republican nominee Tom Huening, 57–39%.

1994
She survived the Republican Revolution, winning reelection with 61% of the vote.

2008

She won reelection against Republican Ronny Santana, 70–22%.

2010

She won reelection against Republican Dave Chapman, 69–28%.

2012

After redistricting, Eshoo ran for and won reelection in California's 18th congressional district based in San Mateo, Santa Clara, and Santa Cruz counties.

2014

After a bitter race that brought to the fore some dissatisfaction over party leadership, regarded as a proxy battle between Steny Hoyer and Nancy Pelosi, Eshoo lost a party vote to Frank Pallone for ranking member of the House Energy and Commerce Committee. Nancy Pelosi had said Eshoo's elevation to the top Democratic spot on that committee would be important for the Democrats, allowing Eshoo "to tap into lucrative fundraising interests in Silicon Valley and elsewhere that the committee has jurisdiction."

2016

2018

2020

Eshoo beat challenger Rishi Kumar in the Democratic primary and was reelected in the general election.

Tenure

In 2003, Eshoo was elected by her Democratic colleagues in the 108th Congress as an At-Large Democratic Whip, and she has served in that position to the present.

On January 30, 2008, Eshoo formally endorsed U.S. Senator Barack Obama for president.

As of October 2021, Eshoo had voted in line with Joe Biden's stated position 100% of the time.

Abortion

Eshoo opposed the overturning of Roe v. Wade.

Biodefense 
On July 16, 2018, Eshoo introduced H.R. 6378, the Pandemic and All Hazards Preparedness and Advancing Innovation Act (PAHPA), along with Representative Susan Brooks, Energy and Commerce Committee Chairman Greg Walden, and Ranking Member Frank Pallone. The September 11 attacks and the deadly anthrax attacks that followed motivated Eshoo and former Representative Richard Burr to create the original PAHPA law, which coordinated responses to public health emergencies and developed medical countermeasures.

H.R. 6378 improves preparedness nationwide and response for public health emergencies by speeding up research and development on medical countermeasures. The bill also focuses on the needs of special populations such as seniors, the disabled, and children.

In March 2018, Eshoo and Brooks launched the Congressional Biodefense Caucus. Within a week, 21 members of Congress had joined. The caucus is "dedicated to strengthening our nation’s biodefense enterprise and national security." It will focus on chemical, biological, radiological, and nuclear (CBRN) threats and pandemic outbreaks.

Campaign finance reform
Eshoo's bill to require presidential and vice-presidential candidates to publicly disclose their last 10 federal tax returns was included in the For the People Act. She has said, "The For the People Act is a once-in-a-generation opportunity to restore the faith and function of American democracy".

Energy policy

Eshoo has voted in favor of bills that expand the creation of jobs in renewable energy. She has also supported energy tax credits for companies that use alternative, non-carbon fuel sources. More recently, she has expressed support for the continued funding of research into fusion power. She is also a supporter of Green New Deal policies and is a co-sponsor of the House resolutions calling for Green New Deal legislation as an effort to combat climate change.

Health care
Eshoo worked on the Affordable Care Act and was present during its signing. She believes in adding a public option to the Act to achieve universal health insurance.

Human rights
Eshoo is a strong supporter of the gay rights movement. In 1992, when a gay-bashing mailer was directed at Supervisor Tom Nolan (the first openly gay supervisor in San Mateo and her opponent for her congressional seat), Eshoo stood fast in defending him, his record and years of service. She opposed the Marriage Protection Amendment and the Marriage Protection Act. Her website called the bill "discriminatory, singling out for the first time a minority to prevent their interests from being considered by the highest courts in the land."

As one of just two Assyrian members of Congress, Eshoo has worked hard to protect indigenous Assyrian Christians in Iraq from continuing religious persecution and political exclusion. She authored an amendment to H.R. 2601, the Foreign Relations Authorization Act, stating that "special attention should be paid to the welfare of Chaldo-Assyrians and other indigenous Christians in Iraq."

Eshoo has been a strong supporter of the congressional resolution recognizing the Armenian genocide. She also supports closer ties between Armenia and the U.S.

Eshoo has fought strongly against certain provisions of the Patriot Act, particularly Section 215 (Access to Business Records), which gives federal investigators the right to obtain any tangible business record without a subpoena.

Eshoo also introduced "Kevin's law," which would have given the U.S. Department of Agriculture the power to close down plants that produce contaminated meat.

As an Assyrian and Armenian American, Eshoo is co-chair and co-founder of the Religious Minorities in the Middle East Caucus. She also serves on the Board of Advisors of The Institute on Religion and Public Policy, a freedom of religion organization.

Immigration
Eshoo has worked to create a legal "pathway to citizenship" for foreign workers of all kinds, from doctors and computer programmers to migrant farm workers. She has voted to increase the annual cap on H-1B visas to allow more temporary foreign professionals to work in the United States (especially those with Master's Degrees or higher).

In California, where as much as 90% of the agricultural workforce is composed of undocumented immigrants, Eshoo cosponsored H.R. 371, the Agricultural Jobs Act, which would confer blue-card status on undocumented immigrants who had worked an agricultural job in the United States for 150 days or more. This bill never became law.

Infrastructure
Eshoo has expressed support for President Biden's American Jobs Plan, calling it "a visionary proposal to create millions of good-paying jobs while revitalizing America’s infrastructure" that "will bring the U.S. into the 21st century."

Taxes
Eshoo voted against the Tax Cuts and Jobs Act of 2017 and has expressed support for repealing the SALT deduction cap, which she views as an unfair burden on the middle class.

National security
On July 29, 2015, Eshoo co-introduced H.R. 3299, the Strengthening Public Health Emergency Response Act of 2015, which would streamline government decisions and provide incentives for vaccines and treatment of dangerous pathogens and diseases. Eshoo co-sponsored the legislation with lead sponsor Rep. Susan Brooks in response to an October 2015 report by the Blue Ribbon Study Panel on Biodefense.

Other legislation includes:
 H.R. 1275, American Dream Act, cosponsor – Allows states to provide tuition to students that are illegal immigrants, provided they meet certain criteria.
 H.R. 1379, Citizen Promotion Act, cosponsor – Assists lawfully admitted aliens in becoming permanent citizens of the United States.
 H.R. 2221, Uniting American Families Act, cosponsor – Amends the Immigration and Nationality Act to include "or permanent partner" where spouse occurs.

Technology
Eshoo authored two bills authorizing electronic signatures that became law, The Government Paperwork Elimination Act of 1998 (GPEA) and ESIGN. She also introduced controversial legislation to alleviate the proliferation of unsolicited email, known as spam. The U.S. House of Representatives passed The CAN-SPAM Act of 2003 (S. 877), which authorizes a “Do Not Spam” list, regulates commercial email, and imposes fines on spammers. Eshoo authored the Consumer Internet Privacy Enhancement Act of 2001 (H.R. 237), created a program to provide discounts to schools and libraries for Internet access, and authored the Computer Donation Incentive Act.

Eshoo introduced HR 2428, the Broadband Conduit Deployment Act of 2009. The bill would require new federal road projects to include plastic conduits buried along the side of the roadway, and enough of them to "accommodate multiple broadband providers." "According to industry experts, more than half of the cost of new broadband deployment is attributable to the expense of tearing up and repaving roads," Eshoo said. "By putting the broadband conduit in place while the ground beneath the roadways is exposed, we will enable any authorized communications provider to come in later and install fiber-optic cable at far less cost." The bill is supported by Google.

Together with Rep. Ed Markey, Eshoo introduced the Internet Freedom Preservation Act of 2009, which would make Net Neutrality the law.

Eshoo is co-chair of the Congressional Internet Caucus, a bipartisan group of over 150 members of the House and Senate working to educate their colleagues about the promise and potential of the Internet.

Eshoo supported the Federal Communications Commission Process Reform Act of 2013 (H.R. 3675; 113th Congress), a bill that would make a number of changes to procedures that the Federal Communications Commission (FCC) follows in its rulemaking processes. The FCC would have to act more transparently as a result of this bill, forced to accept public input about regulations. Eshoo expected Senate support for the bill, saying that they "shouldn't find it menacing" and arguing that the bill was "about the functioning of the FCC in the 21st century."

In 2022, Eshoo, Representative Jan Schakowsky, and Senator Cory Booker introduced the Banning Surveillance Advertising Act (BSAA). Frank Maggio, CEO and founder of React LLC, called the BSAA "rife with loopholes". The act was tabled. According to PC Magazine, some browsers with some extensions can block some surveillance and some advertising.

Committee assignments 
 Committee on Energy and Commerce
 Subcommittee on Communications and Technology 
 Subcommittee on Health (Chair)

Caucus memberships 
 Congressional E-911 Caucus, Co-Chair
 Arthritis Caucus, Co-Chair
 Caucus on Religious Minorities in the Middle East, Co-Chair and Founding Member
 Cancer Care Working Group, Co-Chair
 House 21st Century Health Care Caucus, Vice Chair
 House Information Technology Working Group, Co-Chair
 Congressional Internet Caucus, Founding Member and Co-Chair
 House Medical Technology Caucus, Co-Chair
 Ahmadiyya Muslim Caucus
 Bipartisan Congressional Task Force on Alzheimer's Disease
 California Democratic Congressional Delegation
 Armenian Caucus
 Coalition for Autism Research and Education (CARE)
Congressional Asian Pacific American Caucus
 Congressional Biomedical Research Caucus
 Congressional Caucus for Women's Issues
 Congressional Caucus on Armenian Issues
 Congressional Coalition on Adoption
 Congressional Diabetes Caucus
 Congressional Food Safety Caucus
 Congressional Kidney Caucus
 Congressional Organic Caucus
 Congressional Prevention Coalition
 Congressional Shipbuilding Caucus
 Congressional Taiwan Caucus
 Congressional Wildlife Refuge Caucus
 House Biotechnology Caucus
 House Cancer Caucus
 House National Marine Sanctuary Caucus
 House Oceans Caucus
 House Recycling Caucus
 Long-Term Care Caucus
 United States-Philippines Friendship Caucus
Congressional Arts Caucus
Congressional NextGen 9-1-1 Caucus
Climate Solutions Caucus

Personal life
Eshoo was married to attorney George Eshoo, with whom she has two children, Karen and Paul. Anna Eshoo and George Eshoo are divorced. She resides in Menlo Park, California. She is a Chaldean Catholic. She attends Sacred Heart-Oakwood Catholic Church.

In 2010, Eshoo was named one of the "50 Most Beautiful People" on Capitol Hill by The Hill.

Electoral history

Organizations 
 Chair, San Mateo County General Hospital Board of Directors, 1984–1992
 Member, American Association of University Women
 Former Chair, Bay Area Air Quality Management District
 Former Member, Bay Conservation and Development Commission
 Democratic Activists for Women Now
 Junior League of Palo Alto
 League of Conservation Voters
 Member, League of Women Voters
 Co Founder, San Mateo Women's Hall of Fame.

Awards and honors 
 1989 Legislator of the Year Award from the California's Governor's Committee on the Employing of the Disabled 
 1991 Margaret Sanger Community Service Award from San Mateo County Planned Parenthood 
 1990 Friend of BAYMEC Award 
 1989 Public Official of the Year by the State Commission on Aging 
 1987 Humanitarian of the Year by Easter Seal 
 First woman to join her local chapter of Kiwanis International.
 Honorary doctorate, Humane Letters, Menlo College

See also 
 Women in the United States House of Representatives
 List of Arab and Middle Eastern Americans in the United States Congress

References

External links 

 Congresswoman Anna G. Eshoo official U.S. House website
 Anna Eshoo for Congress campaign website

|-

|-

|-

1942 births
21st-century American politicians
21st-century American women politicians
American Eastern Catholics
American people of Iranian-Assyrian descent
American people of Armenian descent
American politicians of Assyrian descent
American politicians of Iranian descent
American Catholics
Catholics from California
Catholics from Connecticut
Chaldean Catholics
County supervisors in California
Female members of the United States House of Representatives
Information Technology and Innovation Foundation
Living people
Democratic Party members of the United States House of Representatives from California
Middle Eastern Christians
People from Atherton, California
Politicians from New Britain, Connecticut
San Mateo County Supervisors
Women in California politics